Rajkumari Singh may refer to:

 Rajkumari Singh (1923-1979), Guyanese writer, activist
 Ratna Singh (Rajkumari Ratna Singh; born 1959), Indian politician

See also 
 Rajkumar Singh (disambiguation)